Fourth generation may refer to:

 4G, the fourth generation of cellular wireless standards
 Fourth-generation programming language
 Fourth-generation jet fighter
 Fourth generation warfare, conflict characterized by a blurring of the lines between war and politics, soldier and civilian
 Generation IV reactor, a set of theoretical nuclear reactor designs
 History of video game consoles (fourth generation) (1987–1999)
 Yonsei (Japanese diaspora), great-grandchildren of Japanese-born emigrants
A group of Pokémon, see List of generation IV Pokémon

See also 
 Generation (disambiguation)